Connecticut's 97th House of Representatives district elects one member of the Connecticut House of Representatives. It encompasses parts of New Haven and has been represented by Democrat Alphonse Paolillo since 2019.

Recent elections

2020

2018

2016

2014

2012

References

97